Enrique González (born 3 November 1933) is a Spanish fencer. He competed in the individual foil event at the 1960 Summer Olympics.

References

External links
 

1933 births
Living people
Spanish male foil fencers
Olympic fencers of Spain
Fencers at the 1960 Summer Olympics
Sportspeople from Melilla